Pécs is a district in central part of Baranya County, Hungary. Pécs is also the name of the town where the district seat is found. The district is located in the Southern Transdanubia Statistical Region.

Geography 
Pécs District borders with Komló District and Bonyhád District (Tolna County) to the north, Pécsvárad District and Bóly District to the east, Siklós District to the south, Sellye District, Szentlőrinc District and Hegyhát District to the west. The number of the inhabited places in Pécs District is 40.

Municipalities 
The district has 1 urban county, 1 town and 38 villages.
(ordered by population, as of 1 January 2012)

The bolded municipalities are cities.

See also
List of cities and towns in Hungary

References

External links
 Postal codes of the Pécs District

Districts in Baranya County